Windows 11 is a major release of the Windows NT operating system and the successor of Windows 10. Several features that originated in earlier versions of Windows and that were included in versions up to Windows 10 are no longer present in Windows 11. Following is a list of these.

Bundled software 
The following apps are no longer bundled with Windows 11.
 Internet Explorer
 Wallet

Windows shell 
The following parts of the Windows shell are no longer available in Windows 11.

 Lock Screen's quick status
 Tablet mode
 The Timeline feature in Task View
 The Save Search option in File Explorer
In addition:
 The touch keyboard no longer docks in screens larger than 18 inches.
 Windows no longer synchronizes desktop wallpapers across devices with a Microsoft account.
 Windows no longer shows a small preview of images or videos on folder thumbnails. Instead, it shows the generic folder icon for any folder containing images or videos. (This change has been reverted in February 2022 insider builds.)

Start menu 
Some functionality from the Start menu was removed and replaced with other features.

 Folders and groups (reinstated in February 2022 insider builds)
 Live tiles (the Widgets panel provides portions of what the live tiles of Windows 10's bundled apps once provided)
 Recent and pinned files on pinned apps

Taskbar 
The following taskbar features are no longer available as of Windows 11:

 Support for bringing an app into focus by dragging a file to its button (reinstated in February 2022 insider builds)
 Support for moving the taskbar to the top, left, or right of the screen
 Support for changing the size of the taskbar or its icons.
 Support for showing one button for each window on the taskbar (Windows 11 always combines windows of the same app into a group.)
 Support for showing windows labels on taskbar.
 Task Manager can no longer be opened by right-clicking taskbar (reinstated in September 2022 insider builds)
 "Time" is not displayed in the calendar when clicking on the "Date/Time" on taskbar.
 Scheduled events are not displayed in the calendar when opened
 The option to show or hide Windows shell's tray icons (Only third-party icons can be hidden or shown)
 All settings and shortcuts in the taskbar's context menu (Only a shortcut to the taskbar settings area of the Settings app is available.)
 The network and audio flyouts have been consolidated into a new settings flyout.
 "Some icons in the System Tray", although Microsoft doesn't specify which
 Support for third-party taskbar components (deskbands)
 The upward swipe gesture for jumplists
 The People button (The "Chat" button powered by Microsoft Teams takes its place.)
 The News and Interests panel (The "Widgets" panel serves the same purpose.)
 Action Center (Two separate flyouts take its place: "Notification Center" and "Quick Settings")
 Ability to move the system tray from the primary monitor
 Ability to peek at the desktop by hovering the mouse cursor over the Show Desktop button (Available as option in November 2022 update)

Settings 
File History can only be configured using the legacy Control Panel application, which does not support adding custom folders to the set of protected folders as the Settings app in Windows 10 did.

Architecture 
Windows 11 is only available for the x86-64 and ARM64 CPU architectures, as Microsoft no longer offers a Windows build for IA-32 x86 and ARMv7 systems. As a result, NTVDM and the 16-bit Windows on Windows subsystems, which allowed 32-bit versions of Windows to directly run 16-bit DOS and Windows programs, are no longer included with Windows 11.

User-mode scheduling (UMS), available on x64 versions Windows 7 and later, was a lightweight mechanism allowing applications to schedule their own threads, without involvement from the system scheduler. This feature is not included with Windows 11.

See also

References

Features Removed In 
Software features
Microsoft lists
Computing-related lists